Tsletsi Airport  is an airport serving Djelfa, the capital of Djelfa Province in Algeria.

See also

Transport in Algeria
List of airports in Algeria

References

External links
OpenStreetMap - Tsletsi Airport

OurAirports - Tsletsi

Airports in Algeria
Buildings and structures in Djelfa Province